Ramsay is a rural locality in the Toowoomba Region, Queensland, Australia. In the  Ramsay had a population of 348 people.

Geography 
The Great Dividing Range passes through Ramsay, entering from the north from Preston and exiting to the south-east (Budgee / West Haldon). The terrain to the east of the range is mountainous with the following named peaks:

 Darling Point 
 Hay Peak 
 Mount Allen 
 Mount Boodgee 
 Mount Neale 
 Mount Prosper 
 Paddy Point 
 Prosperity Point 
Within the locality, the range is a watershed with the creeks that rise to the east of the range contributing to the North East Coast drainage basin which enter the Coral Sea, while the creeks that rise to the west of the range are ultimately tributaries of the Condamine River, part of the Murray Darling drainage basin.

The land use in the east of the locality is grazing on native vegetation, while the land use in the west of the locality is a mix of grazing and crop growing, the latter generally occurring closer to the creeks.

History 
The locality is named after Robert Ramsay, a pastoralist and politician. He was one of the owners of Eton Vale station and leased the Rosalie Plains pastoral run. He was a member of both the Queensland Legislative Assembly and the Queensland Legislative Council.

Ramsay State School opened on 3 October 1881.

In the  Ramsay had a population of 310 people.

In the  Ramsay had a population of 348 people.

Economy 
There are a number of homesteads in the locality, including:

 Alpine Grange
 Alpine Grange
 Arinya
 Laughma
 Mount Prosper
 Mountain View
 Orourkes House
 Venvale

Education 
Ramsay State School is a government primary (Prep-6) school for boys and girls at 173 Ramsay School Road. In 2018, the school had an enrolment of 46 students with 5 teachers (3 full-time equivalent) and 7 non-teaching staff (3 full-time equivalent).

There are no secondary schools in Ramsay. The nearest government secondary schools are Centenary Heights State High School in Centenary Heights and Harristown State High School in Harristown, both suburbs of Toowoomba to the north, and Clifton State High School in Clifton to the south.

References

Further reading 

 
  — includes information on the now-closed schools of Eton Vale, Top Camp, Preston, Hodgson's Vale.

Toowoomba Region
Localities in Queensland